Malan Island, also known as Peer Ghaib, is a mud volcano located in the Arabian Sea, 3 kilometres off the coast of Balochistan province of Pakistan. It rose out of the water overnight in March 1999 and subsided below sea level within a year. It reappeared in 2010.

See also 
List of volcanoes in Pakistan
List of islands of Pakistan

References

External links
 Makran mud volcanos

Volcanoes of Pakistan
Uninhabited islands of Pakistan
Mud volcanoes
Ephemeral islands
Landforms of Balochistan (Pakistan)